Heidi is a 2005 animated adaptation of the 1881 Johanna Spyri novel, produced by Nelvana, Telemagination and TV-Loonland AG.

Voice cast

English cast
Tajja Isen as Heidi
Christopher Plummer as Grandfather
Jackie Burroughs as Rottenmeier
Juan Chioran as Sebastian
Corinne Conley as Grannie
Michael D'Ascenzo as Peter
Colm Feore as Mr. Sesseman
Kathy Greenwood as Aunt Dete
Ellen-Ray Hennessy as Birgit
Ashley Taylor as Clara Sesemann
Paul Soles as Dr. Reboux

Development
The movie was announced on October 10, 2001.

See also
Heidi's Song, a 1982 Hanna-Barbera film based on the Spyri work.
List of animated feature-length films

References

External links

Toonhound page

2005 animated films
2005 films
British children's animated films
Canadian animated feature films
Canadian children's animated films
German animated films
Heidi films
Films set in Switzerland
Animated films based on novels
Animated films based on children's books
Animated films about orphans
Nelvana films
2000s children's films
2000s Canadian films
2000s British films
2000s German films